The 1986–87 Arkansas Razorbacks men's basketball team represented the University of Arkansas in the 1986-87 season. Led by head coach Nolan Richardson, the Razorbacks would manage a 19–14 record, and a trip to the second round of the NIT. This season, although not the NCAA Tournament, was Arkansas' first postseason tournament under Richardson. The first of many, including a national championship in 1994. The Razorbacks competed in and placed 5th in the Southwest conference.

Roster

Rankings

References

Arkansas Razorbacks men's basketball seasons
Arkansas
Razor
Razor